Xinfengzhen railway station is a station in Lintong District, Xi'an, Shaanxi. The station is the main marshalling yard for Xi'an railway hub and the largest marshalling yard in western China.

History
The station was established in 1934. It was reconstructed as a marshalling yard in 2008.

References

Stations on the Longhai Railway
Railway stations in Xi'an
Railway stations in China opened in 1934